Gołka is a cheese from Poland that is similar to oscypek/oštiepok but made exclusively with milk from cattle. Gołka also has a different shape; it's cylindrical, while oscypek is tapered at both ends (spindle-shaped). The cheese typically has a decorative pattern on its surface resulting from the wooden molds used to press the forms. It has a mildly salty taste with a smoky aroma.

See also
 Polish cuisine
oscypek

References

Polish cheeses
Cow's-milk cheeses